The Colorado Department of Health Care Policy and Financing (HCPF) is the principal department of the Colorado state government responsible for administering the Health First Colorado (Medicaid) and Child Health Plan Plus programs as well as a variety of other programs for Colorado's low-income families, the elderly, and persons with disabilities.

References

External links 
 

Health Care Policy and Financing
Health policy in the United States
Health economics